The canton of Causses-Rougiers is an administrative division of the Aveyron department, southern France. It was created at the French canton reorganisation which came into effect in March 2015. Its seat is in La Cavalerie.

It consists of the following communes:
 
Arnac-sur-Dourdou
Balaguier-sur-Rance
La Bastide-Solages
Belmont-sur-Rance
Brasc
Brusque
Camarès
La Cavalerie
Le Clapier
Combret
Cornus
Coupiac
La Couvertoirade
Fayet
Fondamente
Gissac
L'Hospitalet-du-Larzac
Lapanouse-de-Cernon
Laval-Roquecezière
Marnhagues-et-Latour
Martrin
Mélagues
Montagnol
Montclar
Montfranc
Montlaur
Mounes-Prohencoux
Murasson
Peux-et-Couffouleux
Plaisance
Pousthomy
Rebourguil
Saint-Beaulize
Sainte-Eulalie-de-Cernon
Saint-Jean-et-Saint-Paul
Saint-Juéry
Saint-Sernin-sur-Rance
Saint-Sever-du-Moustier
Sauclières
La Serre
Sylvanès
Tauriac-de-Camarès
Viala-du-Pas-de-Jaux

References

Cantons of Aveyron